Brownlow William Knox (1806 – 14 March 1873) was a British Conservative Party politician.

He was elected MP for Great Marlow in 1847 and held the seat until 1868.

References

External links
 

Conservative Party (UK) MPs for English constituencies
UK MPs 1847–1852
UK MPs 1852–1857
UK MPs 1857–1859
UK MPs 1859–1865
UK MPs 1865–1868
1806 births
1873 deaths